Akkanahalli may refer to:

Akkanahalli, Hassan, a village in the Channarayapatna taluk of Hassan district in Karnataka, India
Akkanahalli, Tumkur, a village in the Chiknayakanhalli taluk of Tumkur district in Karnataka, India